The Ven. Joseph Amyrauld (some sources, Amirault) (1644-1714) was a Church of Ireland priest in the  late 17th and early 18th centuries.

Gore was born in Carrig, County Tipperary and educated at Trinity College, Dublin. He was ordained on 31 March 1667. In 1690 he succeeded his father as Archdeacon of Kilfenora and in 1691 also became Archdeacon of Killaloe.

Notes

1644 births
1714 deaths
Archdeacons of Kilfenora
Archdeacons of Killaloe
17th-century Irish Anglican priests
18th-century Irish Anglican priests
Alumni of Trinity College Dublin
People from County Tipperary